The 1946–47 Oklahoma Sooners men's basketball team represented the University of Oklahoma in college basketball during the 1946–47 NCAA men's basketball season. The Oklahoma Sooners men's basketball team were a member of the National Collegiate Athletic Association's (NCAA) Big Six Conference.  The team was led by Bruce Drake in his ninth season as head coach of the Sooners. Oklahoma posted a 24–7 overall record and an 8–2 conference record to finish with the Big Six Conference title. The Sooners advanced to the 1947 NCAA basketball tournament and lost to Holy Cross in the national title game.

Schedule

|-
!colspan=9 style=| Regular season

|-
!colspan=9 style=| NCAA Tournament

References

Oklahoma Sooners men's basketball seasons
Oklahoma
Oklahoma
NCAA Division I men's basketball tournament Final Four seasons